The Other Woman is a 1954 American film noir written, directed and produced by Hugo Haas. Haas, Cleo Moore and John Qualen starred in the film.

Plot
After aspiring actress Sherry Stewart auditions for director Walter Darman but doesn't get the part, she decides to blackmail him.

Sherry and her boyfriend Ronnie cook up a scheme, drugging Darman's drink, lying to him later that he and Sherry had become intimate, then threatening to tell his wife unless Darman comes up with $50,000.

Darman decides to confront Sherry directly, but tempers flare and he strangles her to death. His wife Lucille chooses an inopportune time to confront the actress herself, finding the body. A police inspector suspects the truth and Darman's guilty conscience eventually forces him to confess.

Cast
 Hugo Haas as Walter Darman
 Cleo Moore as Sherry Stewart
 Lance Fuller as Ronnie
 Lucille Barkley as Mrs. Lucille Darman
 Jack Macy as Charles Lester
 John Qualen as Papasha
 Jan Arvan as Police Inspector Collins
 Karolee Kelly as Marion

Reception

Critical response
Film critic Dennis Schwartz dismissed the film as "...a dull film noir, suffering from an unconvincing plot, and dry acting." Cinema scholar Milan Hain is much more sympathetic to the film. "The Other Woman is Haas' most ambitious film, with many themes and motifs mirroring his own career: life in exile characterized by disillusionment and entrapment, loss of one's identity and social status, hopeless struggle with the Hollywood machinery, and the impossibility of fully realizing one's artistic visions."

References

External links
 
 
 
 The Other Woman informational site and essay by Mark Fertig
 

1954 films
1954 crime drama films
American crime drama films
American black-and-white films
20th Century Fox films
Film noir
Films scored by Ernest Gold
Films directed by Hugo Haas
1950s English-language films
1950s American films